Robert Margouleff is an American record producer, recording engineer, electronic music pioneer, audio expert, and film producer.

Career

The Birth of TONTO
Margouleff was an early customer, friend and collaborator of fellow New Yorker and music instrument pioneer Robert Moog, contributing early insight toward Moog's musical instrument development for artists to routinely program and use synthesizers. He also was an early creative resource at Andy Warhol's "factory", eventually co-producing Ciao! Manhattan (1972), a semi-biographical cult film tale of 1960s counterculture film actress and socialite Edie Sedgwick, one of Warhol's "superstars".

In 1968, Robert Margouleff purchased a Moog Series IIIc, which was intended to be the "first orchestra of synthesizers". He soon went on to meet well-known bassist Malcolm Cecil, who approached him to learn more about this synthesizer. In exchange for Cecil teaching Margouleff how to use the recording console, Margouleff taught Cecil how to use the Moog. In just two weeks, the duo set to build the largest synthesizer in the world. A few weeks later, they jointly formed a group known as TONTO's Expanding Head Band, through which they explored the nearly unlimited capabilities of their machine. They recorded the album Zero Time (1971), attracting attention from many other leading artists of that era to the newly emerging music technology.

Stevie Wonder
Beginning in 1972, Margouleff and Cecil worked with Stevie Wonder on a string of award-winning albums, including Music of My Mind (1972), Talking Book (1972), Innervisions (1973) and Fulfillingness' First Finale (1974), all of which featured Margouleff and Cecil as associate producers, engineers and synthesizer programmers.

TONTO was pivotal in the duo's relationship with Wonder because it allowed him to arrange his own tracks and to be involved in each step of the recording process. Over a three day stretch, the trio recorded 17 songs together for their first release. After Fulfillingness' First Finale, Margouleff and Moog ceased collaboration with Wonder, due to unfair business relations and a changed relationship with him.

Margouleff described the relationship between himself, Cecil and Wonder as "like three meteors in the sky and they're all flying towards one another. For one brief second there's this huge bright light when all three meteors cross paths at the same time and there's just this brilliant flash... and it just goes away. That's how it was with me, Steve, and Malcolm."

Post-Wonder
In 1975, TONTO's Expanding Head Band resumed with It's About Time and the pair collaborated on Billy Preston's album It's My Pleasure. Margouleff went on to produce music with Jeff Beck, Robin Trower, David Sanborn, Depeche Mode, Oingo Boingo, the Doobie Brothers, Quincy Jones, Bobby Womack, the Isley Brothers, Gil Scott-Heron, Weather Report, Stephen Stills, Dave Mason, Little Feat, Joan Baez, Steve Hillage, Paul Rodgers, GWAR and many others.

In 1980, Margouleff produced the Freedom of Choice album for American new wave band Devo. On working with Margouleff, Devo's co-founder and principal songwriter Gerald Casale said, "He just brought the right kind of tone and energy to the fact that we [were] using mini-Moogs". In an interview for Rhino Records, Casale described how Devo's demos for the album, which featured extensive usage of the Moog Bass, convinced Margouleff to work with them.

1995–present
Margouleff is currently a partner in Safe Harbor Pictures LLC. in Los Angeles, California, where he has developed a fully tape-less 2D / 3D High definition production workflow, from shooting to editing. As an avid sailor and documentary filmmaker, Margouleff is producing Tall Ships of the World, a 13-episode series about America's greatest sailing ships, which will be available on Blu-ray in 3D.

In 1997, Margouleff was a principal founder of Mi Casa Multimedia in Hollywood, California, a leading boutique surround sound (multi-channel audio) mixing studio specializing in home theatre DTS and DVD / HD DVD releases for major motion picture studios. Mi Casa Multimedia studios is located in a former home of actor Béla Lugosi.

Margouleff was invited to present as the Keynote Speaker for the 129th AES Convention on November 4, 2010, at the Moscone Center in San Francisco, California. His lecture was titled "What the Hell Happened?", which examined the influence of fast-paced technological developments on creativity in the music industry and the recording arts.

In 2013, the National Music Centre acquired TONTO.

Personal life
Margouleff is the son of Great Neck Estates Mayor Jean Margouleff and Ruth Margouleff. He also has one sister.

Discography
With Malcolm Cecil
 1971: Zero Time – Tonto's Expanding Head Band
 1975: It's About Time – Tonto's Expanding Head Band

Engineering, production, programming credits with Cecil
 1970: A Moog Mass – Caldara
 1971: The Great Blind Degree – Richie Havens
 1972: Music of My Mind – Stevie Wonder
 1972: Talking Book – Stevie Wonder
 1973: Innervisions – Stevie Wonder
 1973: The Captain and Me – The Doobie Brothers
 1973: 3+3 – The Isley Brothers
 1973: Kindling – Gene Parsons
 1974: Fulfillingness' First Finale – Stevie Wonder
 1974: Good Old Boys – Randy Newman
 1974: Live It Up – The Isley Brothers
 1974: Shankar Family & Friends – Ravi Shankar
 1975: It's My Pleasure – Billy Preston
 1975: The Heat Is On – The Isley Brothers
 1975: Join Me and Let's Be Free – Wilson Pickett
 1975: Tale Spinnin' – Weather Report
 1977: Motivation Radio – Steve Hillage

Credits with other artists
(see also Malcolm Cecil Discography, Margouleff and Cecil (together) Discography)
 1966/1985: Original Television Soundtrack Star Trek From the Original Pilots "The Cage" & "Where No Man Has Gone Before" – Alexander Courage
 1968: Presenting... – Lothar and the Hand People
 1973: Hat Trick – America (synth programming)
 1976: Billy Preston – Billy Preston
 1976: 2nd Resurrection – The Stairsteps
 1977: Ready for the World – Inner Circle 
 1978: Introducing the ARP Avatar – Ned Liben
 1980: Minimum Wage Rock & Roll – The BusBoys 
 1980: Freedom of Choice – Devo
 1982: As We Speak – David Sanborn
 1982: The Innocents – The Innocents
 1983: Good for Your Soul – Oingo Boingo
 1986: "All I Need" – The Manhattans (additional producer, remix)
 1986: "But Not Tonight" – Depeche Mode (additional producer, remix)
 1987: Renaissance – Branford Marsalis
 1987: American Soul Man – Wilson Pickett
 1990: The Odd Get Even – Shadowfax
 1991: Live in Concert – 2 Live Crew 
 1992: Freedom to Fly – Tony MacAlpine
 1994: Alternative NRG – various artists
 1995: Conversation Peace – Stevie Wonder (mixing)
 Unknown: Rumor Has It EP – Avalon

Awards and recognition
 Grammy Award for Best Engineered Album, Non-Classical – 1974
 Malcolm Cecil & Robert Margouleff (engineers) for Innervisions performed by Stevie Wonder

References

External links
 Mi Casa Multimedia
 Tonto's Expanding Head Band
 Virtual Synthesizer Museum's TONTO page
 Robert Margouleff Keynote Speaker for 129th AES Convention
 Safe Harbor Pictures

Living people
Record producers from New York (state)
Grammy Award winners
Year of birth missing (living people)